Isakly may refer to:
Isakly, alternative name of Isaqlı, a village in Jabrayil Raion of Azerbaijan
Isakly, Russia, a rural locality (a selo) in Samara Oblast, Russia